Astragalus fragrans is a species of milkvetch in the family Fabaceae.

References

fragrans